Gordon Joseph Sullivan (January 20, 1920 – October 7, 2011) was the Liberal MP for the riding of Hamilton Mountain from 1968 until 1972. He was a lawyer and judge by profession.

Sullivan was a vocal opponent of abortion.  He voted against his own government's omnibus bill to update the Canadian criminal code in 1969, because he disagreed with its provision to liberalize the country's abortion laws.

References

1920 births
2011 deaths
Liberal Party of Canada MPs
Members of the House of Commons of Canada from Ontario
Politicians from Hamilton, Ontario
Canadian abortion law